"Raindrops" is a song by British electronic music duo Basement Jaxx. It was released on 22 June 2009 as the first single from their fifth studio album, Scars. The song uses the Auto-Tune effect, while the male vocals for the song come from the group member Felix Buxton.

Music video
The Jess Holzworth-directed music video for the song made its debut on Channel 4 on 6 June 2009 and it is filmed partly in a kaleidoscope style, featuring women dancing provocatively in colourful feathers, masks, and ferns.

Critical reception 

The song has been highly praised by critics. BBC rated the song whole five stars, describing it as "a slinky, pounding, twinkling, uplifting house juggernaut". Digital Spy gave the song three stars, saying that it is "warm and uplifting as a summer breeze flurrying under your skirt" and "marks a welcome, if slightly cautious, return". PopMatters rated "Raindrops" eight out of ten stars, praising both the video and the song as "deliciously disco-esque". Pitchfork Media also gave the song 8 stars, and described it as "one of their best songs" as well as "unashamedly psychedelic, without losing its disco heart". Metro.co.uk described the single as "an exotic confection laced with rock melodies and a distinctive killer bassline".

Pitchfork later ranked the song at number 24 in their list of the Top 100 Tracks of 2009.

Track listings 

 CD

 "Raindrops"
 "Wheel N Stop (feat. Serocee) (Planet 3 version)"

 12" vinyl

 "Raindrops (Original)"
 "Raindrops (Funk Agenda & Paul Thomas Redux)"

Charts 

"Raindrops" made its debut on the UK Singles Chart on 28 June 2009 at number 21. The song also debuted at number 27 in Ireland, and later climbed to number 20.

Release history

References 

Basement Jaxx songs
XL Recordings singles
2009 singles
2009 songs